Crenicichla maculata is a species of cichlid native to South America. It is found in Brazil.

References

maculata
Freshwater fish of Brazil
Taxa named by Sven O. Kullander
Taxa named by Carlos Alberto Santos de Lucena
Fish described in 2006